Atomotricha sordida is a moth in the family Oecophoridae first described by Arthur Gardiner Butler in 1877. It is endemic to New Zealand.

References

Moths described in 1877
Oecophoridae
Moths of New Zealand
Endemic fauna of New Zealand
Taxa named by Arthur Gardiner Butler
Endemic moths of New Zealand